"Bagong Pagsilang", also known as the "March of the New Society" and incorrectly referred to by its chorus "Sa Bagong Lipunan", was a march commissioned during the presidency of Ferdinand Marcos for the Kilusang Bagong Lipunan or New Society Movement, a movement introduced by Marcos upon the declaration of martial law in 1972. The lyrics were written by Levi Celerio and the music was composed by Felipe Padilla de León in 1973.

A new rendition of the song was performed by the rock band Plethora and was used as the campaign anthem by his son, Bongbong Marcos, during his 2022 presidential campaign. This was even used as an inspection march of President Marcos, Jr. during the 78th Leyte Landing Anniversary on October 20, 2022 and during his camp visit to the Eastern Mindanao Command in Davao City on October 27, 2022.

Compositional history 
According to the composer's eldest son, Felipe Mendoza de Leon, two days after the declaration of martial law, at 2 a.m., two military trucks came to their house asking for a "hymn and a march for the New Society" as requested by First Lady Imelda Marcos to be delivered by Sunday. Felipe asked his son for help, with the father focusing on the hymn and the son working on the first 16-bars of the march. After the hymn was finished, he completed the rest of the march his son has started. The composer is said to have put subversive elements to Bagong Pagsilang, just like he did on his 1942 "Awit sa Paglikha ng Bagong Pilipinas". According to his eldest son on a lecture, the composer secretly quoted a portion of the protest song "Bayan Ko" in a part of the song.

The march, along with its complementing hymn ("Bagong Lipunan") also composed by Felipe Padilla de Leon, was featured on the 1973 proprietary vinyl album Mga Awitin At Tugtugin Ng Pilipinas Sa Bagong Lipunan performed by The Philippine Constabulary Band and The Philippine Constabulary Choral Ensemble. The march, hymn, and other patriotic songs were published in 1974 in the book "Mga Awit sa Bagong Lipunan" ("Songs in the New Society").

Lyrics

References

Presidency of Ferdinand Marcos
1973 in the Philippines
1973 songs
Tagalog-language songs
Filipino patriotic songs
Songs with lyrics by Levi Celerio
Songs with music by Felipe Padilla de León
Philippine anthems